The salpingopharyngeus muscle is a muscle of the pharynx. It arises from the lower part of the cartilage of the Eustachian tube, and inserts into the palatopharyngeus muscle by blending with its posterior fasciculus. It is innervated by vagus nerve (cranial nerve X) via the pharyngeal plexus. It raises the pharynx and larynx during deglutition (swallowing) and laterally draws the pharyngeal walls up. It opens the pharyngeal orifice of the Eustachian tube during swallowing to allow for the equalization of pressure between it and the pharynx.

Structure 
The salpingopharyngeus is a very slender muscle. It passes inferior-ward from its origin to its insertion.

Origin 
The salpingopharyngeus muscle arises from the superior border of the medial cartilage of the Eustachian tube, in the nasal cavity. This makes the posterior welt of the torus tubarius.

Insertion 
It blend with the posterior fasciculus of the palatopharyngeus muscle.

Innervation 
The salpingopharyngeus is supplied by the vagus nerve (CN X) via the pharyngeal plexus.

Blood supply 
The salpingopharyngeus muscle is supplied by the ascending pharyngeal artery.

Variation 
The salpingopharyngeus muscle is absent in about 40% of individuals. It is more common in thin individuals.

Function 
The salpingopharyngeus muscle raises the pharynx and larynx during deglutition (swallowing) and laterally draws the pharyngeal walls up. Unusually, it is relaxed during deglutition, but contracts at all other times. It opens the pharyngeal orifice of the Eustachian tube during swallowing allowing for the equalization of pressure between the it and the pharynx.

See also
 Salpinx

Additional images

References

External links
 Illustration at princetonchiropractic.com

Muscles of the head and neck
Pharynx